Barry Blanchard (born March 29, 1959) is one of North America's top alpinists, noted for pushing the standards of highly technical, high-risk alpine climbing in the Canadian Rockies and the Himalayas.

Climbing accomplishments 
Blanchard was born in Calgary, Alberta, Canada. He first came to note in 1983 with the first ascent of Andromeda Strain on Mount Andromeda in Alberta, Canada with David Cheesmond and Tim Friesen. In 1984, he climbed the North Spur of Rakaposhi, Pakistan with Dave Cheesmond and Kevin Doyle. With David Cheesmond, he climbed the North Pillar of North Twin, Alberta in 1985. Rather than resting on his laurels, he has continued to push the limits of alpinism since, including eight trips to Asia to climb in the Himalayas and Karakoram.

Guiding career 
Blanchard has been involved with Yamnuska Mountain Adventures since its inception in the late 1970s. Blanchard is an internationally certified UIAGM mountain guide.

He helped in the making of Hollywood climbing movies including K2, Cliffhanger and Vertical Limit.

He lives in Canmore, Alberta, with his wife Catherine Mulvihill whom he met on a Mount Everest expedition in 1994, and their family.

Notable ascents
 1983 The Andromeda Strain, Mt. Andromeda, Canada - first ascent with David Cheesmond and Tim Friesen.
 1984 North Ridge of Rakaposhi, Pakistan - first alpine ascent with David Cheesmond and Kevin Doyle.
 1984 East Face (V/VI 5.8 WI5) of Mount Fay, Canadian Rockies, FA with David Cheesmond and Carl Tobin.
 1985 North Pillar of North Twin, Canada - first ascent with David Cheesmond
 1991 North Face of Kusum Kanguru, Nepal - first ascent of route.
 1991 Blanchard-Twight on Les Droites, Mont Blanc Massif, French Alps - hard new route with Mark Twight.
 1999 M-16, East Face of Howse Peak, Canada - first ascent (in winter) with Steve House and Scott Backes.
1999 Pugilist at Rest, (VI 5.10 A3 M5, 1000m), Mount Alverstone, Saint Elias Mountains, Canada. FA with Mark Wilford.
 2000 Infinite Spur on Mount Foraker, Alaska - third ascent with Carl Tobin.
 2002 Infinite Patience on the Emperor Face of Mount Robson - first ascent.

Works
The Calling - A life Rocked by Mountains, for which he was awarded the 2015 Boardman Tasker Prize for Mountain Literature.

References

External links 
 Yamnuska Mountain Adventures
 Ambassador of Patagonia

1959 births
Living people
Canadian mountain climbers
Sportspeople from Calgary
People from Banff, Alberta